George Edward Lerchen (December 1, 1922 – March 26, 2014) was a backup outfielder in Major League Baseball who played from  through  for the Detroit Tigers (1952) and Cincinnati Redlegs (1953). Listed at 5' 11", 175 lb., Lerchen was a switch-hitter and threw right-handed. He was born in Detroit, Michigan. His cousin, Dutch Lerchen, played briefly for the 1910 Boston Red Sox. 
	
In a two-season career Lerchen was a .204 hitter (10-for-49) with one home run and five RBI in 36 games, including three runs, 10 doubles, one stolen base, and a .361 on-base percentage. In eight outfield appearances at center field (4) and right, he posted a perfect 1.000 fielding percentage in 16 chances.

References

Baseball Reference
Retrosheet

1922 births
2014 deaths
Baseball players from Detroit
Cincinnati Redlegs players
Detroit Tigers players
Major League Baseball outfielders
Jamestown Falcons players
Miami Marlins (IL) players
Tulsa Oilers (baseball) players
Houston Buffaloes players
Portland Beavers players
Buffalo Bisons (minor league) players
Toledo Mud Hens players
Flint Arrows players
Williamsport Grays players
Williamsport Tigers players